Erygia semiplaga is a moth of the family Erebidae found in Honduras.

References

Moths described in 1859
Erygia
Moths of Central America